Jules Jomby (born 30 November 1993 in Douala), better known by the stage name Dinos (formerly known as Dinos Punchlinovic), is a French rapper from La Courneuve, Seine-Saint-Denis.

History

Early life 
Dinos was born in Douala, Cameroon. He moved to La Courneuve, France, at the age of 4.

Career 
He released his first project called Thumb Up in 2011, and began to make a name for himself in Paris' underground rap battles.

In May 2013, Dinos signed to Def Jam France, and on 3 June 2013 he released an EP titled L'Alchimiste in reference to Paulo Coelho's book of the same name.

In 2014, Dinos left Def Jam France for Capitol Music France and released, on 14 April 2014, a second EP titled Appearances, supported by the song "Namek"; which was Dinos' first success.

After a two-year hiatus, Dinos announced his debut album Imany. Between the announcement of this album and its release, he dropped Pas Imany mais presque in 2016. Dinos marks his return on 8 December 2017 with the single Flashé. On 30 March 2018 he unveiled the single Les pleurs du mal. On 27 April 2018 Dinos finally released Imany, his first studio album. On 20 August 2018 Dinos appeared in "Colors", a popular German music show on YouTube, and delivered a live performance of his song Argentique. On 7 December 2018 the artist released a "Deluxe" edition of Imany.

On 29 November 2019 Dinos released his second studio album, Taciturne.

Discography

Studio albums

Singles

Featuring in

Other charted songs

*Did not appear in the official Belgian Ultratop 50 charts, but rather in the bubbling under Ultratip charts.

References

1993 births
Living people
French rappers
Rappers from Seine-Saint-Denis
Cameroonian emigrants to France
People from Douala